A milk churn is a tall, conical or cylindrical container for the transportation of milk. It is sometimes referred to as a milk can.

History

The usage of the word 'churn' was retained for describing these containers, although they were not themselves used for 'churning' butter. The milk churn was also known as  the milk kit in the Yorkshire Dales. The 12-gallon steel churns were later replaced with 10-gallon aluminium alloy churns. Their lids had a small hole in its outer rim for tying the producers label on.

Milk churn stands

In Britain, milk churns would be left by dairy farmers by the roadside on purpose-built platforms, or stands, at the right height to be loaded on to the dairy's cart or lorry. They fell out of use when milk began to be collected by tanker from the farm and ceased entirely by 1979. Some stands remain in the countryside as historical features, but most have been dismantled or left to decay.

Gallery

References

Dairy farming
Dairy farming in the United Kingdom
Milk
Milk containers